Filmform is a Swedish foundation dedicated to promotion, distribution and preservation of Swedish art film and experimental video. It was founded in 1950. The Filmform collection includes titles from 1924 until today. Filmform is supported by the Ministry of Culture (Kulturdepartementet) through the Arts Grants Committee (Konstnärsnämnden).

External links 
Film form
Moderna Museet (in Swedish)

Film organizations in Sweden